The Bonito River is a river of Rio de Janeiro state in southeastern Brazil.
It is a tributary of the Macaé River.

The river is protected by the  Macaé de Cima Environmental Protection Area, created in 2001.

See also
List of rivers of Rio de Janeiro

References

Rivers of Rio de Janeiro (state)